Chrysis rutiliventris is a Palearctic species of cuckoo wasp.

References

External links
Images representing  Chrysis rutiliventris

Hymenoptera of Europe
Chrysididae
Insects described in 1879